Süleymanlı is a neighborhood of the district of Elmadağ, Ankara Province, Turkey.

References

Populated places in Ankara Province
Elmadağ, Ankara
Neighbourhoods of Elmadağ